FC Café is a football team from Ermera, East Timor. They play in the Liga Futebol Amadora Segunda Divisão. CAFE was stand for Centro Associativo de Futbol da Ermera

Competition records

Liga Futebol Amadora 
2016 Segunda Divisao: 4th place in Group B

Taça 12 de Novembro
2016: 1st Round

References

External links
FC Café at national-football-teams.com

Football clubs in East Timor
Football
Ermera Municipality